Memorial is the debut novel by Bryan Washington. It was published by Riverhead Books on October 27, 2020, to acclaim from book critics.

Plot
Benson lives with Mike in Houston. Mike goes to Osaka to take care of his estranged father who is dying. Meanwhile, Mike's mother Mitsuko is visiting and staying at his place in Houston, with Benson.

Characters
Benson – a black day care teacher
Mike – a Japanese-American chef at a Mexican restaurant
Mitsuko – Mike's mother

Reception
Memorial received favorable reviews from critics, with a cumulative "Rave" rating at the review aggregator website Book Marks based on a sample of 21 reviews.

In its starred review, Kirkus Reviews called it "vividly written" and wrote, "Washington's novel is richly layered and thrives in the quiet moments between lovers and family members." In its starred review, Publishers Weekly wrote that Washington applied "nuance in equal measure to his characters and the places they're tied to." Michael Schaub of NPR called the novel a "masterpiece" and praised Washington's "ability to draw the reader's attention to what's not said as much as what is." Ron Charles of The Washington Post praised the novel's narration, writing, "Washington inhabits these two men so naturally that the sophistication of this form is rendered entirely invisible, and their narratives unspool as spontaneously and clearly as late-night conversation."

In December 2020, Emily Temple of Literary Hub reported that the novel had made 14 lists of the best books of 2020.

Television adaptation
On October 13, 2020, A24 announced it had purchased the rights to adapt the novel for television, with Washington adapting his novel.

Awards and nominations
 Honor, 2021 Stonewall Book Award - Barbara Gittings Literature Award Honor 
 Longlist, 2021 Andrew Carnegie Medal for Excellence in Fiction

References

2020 American novels
2020 debut novels
Riverhead Books books
Novels set in Houston
Novels set in Osaka
2020s LGBT novels
American LGBT novels
Novels with gay themes